Yatma is a Palestinian town in the Nablus Governorate in northern West Bank, located 15 kilometers south of Nablus. According to the Palestinian Central Bureau of Statistics (PCBS), the town had a population of 2,981 inhabitants in mid-year 2006.

Location
Yatma is  located 12.4 km south of Nablus. It is bordered by Qabalan to the east and south, Beita to the north, Yasuf  and As Sawiya to the west.

History
Pottery sherds from the Iron Age II,  Persian, Hellenistic/Roman and the Crusader/Ayyubid eras have been found here.

It has been suggested that this was the place of origin of Dosthai of Kefar Iathma, and that it was  the Eincheitem of the Crusader period.

Sherds from the  Mamluk era has also been found here.

Ottoman era
The population was 10 households and 2 bachelors, all Muslim. They paid a  fixed  tax rate of 33,3% on agricultural products, such as  wheat, barley, summer crops, olive trees, goats and beehives, a press for olive oil or grape syrup, in addition to occasional revenues and a fixed tax for people of Nablus area; a total of 1,800 akçe. Sherds from the early Ottoman era have also been found here.

In 1838, Edward Robinson noted it as part of Jurat Merda District, south of Nablus. 

In 1850/1 de Saulcy noted Yatma on his travels in the region, as did 
Victor Guérin in 1870.

In 1882, the Palestine Exploration Fund's  Survey of Western Palestine Yetma was described as "A little village, on high ground, with olives round it."

British Mandate era
In the  1922 census of Palestine conducted by the British Mandate authorities,  Yatma had a  population of 242 Muslims, increasing  in  the 1931 census to 325 Muslims, in  64 houses.

In the 1945 statistics the population was 440 Muslims  while the total land area was 3,777 dunams, according to an official land and population survey. 
Of this, 1,214 dunams were used for plantations and irrigable land, 1,741 for cereals, while 44 dunams were classified as built-up areas.

Jordanian era
In the wake of the 1948 Arab–Israeli War, and after the 1949 Armistice Agreements, Yatma came under Jordanian rule.

The Jordanian census of 1961 found 618 inhabitants.

Post 1967

Since the Six-Day War in 1967, Yatma has been under Israeli occupation. 

After the  1995 accords, 29% of village land is defined as Area B land, while the remaining 71% is defined as Area C land. Israel has also confiscated village land for Israeli bypass roads.  

In 2011, two cars were set ablaze in Yatma and the village mosque was vandalised with Hebrew graffiti, reading "price tag" and "Migron", in what was assumed to be a price tag attack by Israeli settlers.

References

Bibliography

External links
 Welcome to Yatma
Survey of Western Palestine, Map 14:  IAA,  Wikimedia commons
 Yatma Village Profile, Applied Research Institute–Jerusalem (ARIJ) 
 Yatma, aerial photo, ARIJ
 Development Priorities and Needs in Yatma, ARIJ

Nablus Governorate
Villages in the West Bank
Municipalities of the State of Palestine